The following lists events that happened during 2004 in South Africa.

Incumbents
 President: Thabo Mbeki.
 Deputy President: Jacob Zuma.
 Chief Justice: Arthur Chaskalson.

Cabinet 
The Cabinet, together with the President and the Deputy President, forms part of the Executive.

National Assembly

Provincial Premiers 
 Eastern Cape Province: Makhenkesi Stofile (until 26 April), Nosimo Balindlela (since 26 April)
 Free State Province: Winkie Direko (until 26 April), Beatrice Marshoff (since 26 April)
 Gauteng Province: Mbhazima Shilowa 
 KwaZulu-Natal Province: Lionel Mtshali (until 26 April), S'bu Ndebele (since 26 April)
 Limpopo Province: 
 until 22 April: Ngoako Ramathlodi 
 22 April-26 April: Catherine Mabuza
 since 26 April: Sello Moloto
 Mpumalanga Province: Ndaweni Mahlangu (until 26 April), Thabang Makwetla (since 26 April)
 North West Province: Popo Molefe (until 30 April), Edna Molewa (since 30 April)
 Northern Cape Province: Manne Dipico (until 30 April), Elizabeth Dipuo Peters (since 30 April)
 Western Cape Province: 
 until 23 April: Marthinus van Schalkwyk
 23 April-30 April: Leonard Ramatlakane 
 since 30 April: Ebrahim Rasool

Events

January
 1 – Asher Karni, an Israeli and South African businessman from Sea Point who is alleged to have supplied nuclear technology to Pakistan, is arrested at Denver International Airport, Colorado.

March
 7 – 64 suspected mercenaries are arrested at Harare, Zimbabwe. 20 of them are South African including their leader, Simon Mann, a former British Army officer and security expert.
 Building of the new Giriyondo Border Post between South Africa and Mozambique in the Great Limpopo Transfrontier Park begins.

April
 14 – The third democratic elections are held and won by the African National Congress.
 16 – A set of shell beads, estimated to be 75,000 years old, is discovered at the excavations at Blombos cave near Stilbaai in the Western Cape.

May
•On May 15 2004, South Africa won the bid to host the 2010 FIFA World Cup.

June
 Nelson Mandela announces he is "retiring from retirement".
July
 1 – A South African Air Force Oryx helicopter crash lands near the Johannesburg International Airport, with no fatalities.
 6 – A South African Air Force SE-316B Alouette III helicopter crash lands at Grahamstown, with no fatalities.
 Avian influenza is diagnosed in ostriches in the Eastern Cape and Western Cape.

August
Wreaths are laid in remembrance to those who died in service of their country.
 25 – Sir Mark Thatcher, son of former British Prime Minister Margaret Thatcher, is arrested at his home in Cape Town for his alleged involvement in the Equatorial Guinea coup plot.
 27 – Simon Mann, former British Army officer, security expert and mercenary, is found guilty of attempting to buy arms for the alleged Equatorial Guinea coup plot and is sentenced to 7 years imprisonment, while the 66 co-accused are acquitted.

September
 1 – Six people are killed and more than 100 are injured in a gas explosion in the Sasol synthetic fuel plant in Secunda.
 9 – The first locally assembled Agusta A109 light utility helicopter makes its first flight at Denel's Kempton Park facilities.

December
 15 – South Africa announces that it will buy the Airbus A400M transport aircraft.
 26 – 17 South Africans are among the victims of the 2004 Indian Ocean tsunami.

Births

Deaths
 13 March – Dullah Omar, lawyer and politician. (b. 1934)
 9 May – Brenda Fassie, singer. (b. 1964)
 27 May – Nimrod Sejake, activist. (b. 1920)
 7 September – Beyers Naudé, cleric, theologian and activist. (b. 1915)
 12 September – Rachel Simons, communist trade unionist. (b. 1914)
 12 December – Phaswane Mpe, poet and novelist. (b. 1970)
 25 December – Ian Syster, long-distance runner. (b. 1976)

Sports

Olympic Games
 The team of Roland Schoeman, Lyndon Ferns, Darian Townsend and Ryk Neethling wins the gold medal at the 2004 Olympic Games in Athens, simultaneously breaking the world record in the 4x100 freestyle relay. Shoeman, Ferns and Neethling trained at the University of Arizona.

See also
2005 in South African television

References

South Africa
Years in South Africa
History of South Africa